The Berkley Common Historic District is a historic district encompassing the historic heart of Berkley, Massachusetts.  The town's village center is located near its geographic center, roughly midway between Massachusetts Route 24 and the Taunton River.  Its central focus is the triangular town common, bounded by Main, Locust, and Porter Streets.  The common is flanked by a number municipal and civic buildings, and has been the town's focus of civic life for more about 275 years.

The district was added to the National Register of Historic Places in 2016.

Gallery

See also
National Register of Historic Places listings in Bristol County, Massachusetts

References

Historic districts in Bristol County, Massachusetts
National Register of Historic Places in Bristol County, Massachusetts
Berkley, Massachusetts
Historic districts on the National Register of Historic Places in Massachusetts